The Detectives is a British comedy television series, starring Jasper Carrott, Robert Powell, and George Sewell. It aired on BBC One from 27 January 1993 to 28 December 1997, and was a spoof of police dramas. It was written by Mike Whitehill and Steve Knight.

Concept
The Detectives originated from a recurring sketch that first appeared on Jasper Carrott's comedy show Canned Carrott. Because of its success, it was turned into a television series. There were a few differences from the sketch to the TV series, such as Dave Briggs being married in the sketch (to Brenda), while in the series, both he and Louis are single and hopeless at romance.

Jasper Carrott and Robert Powell play the bumbling detective constables Bob Louis and David Briggs. They were bad at their job, to the despair of their boss, Superintendent Frank Cottam (played by Sewell). However, they usually ended up solving their cases.

The BBC compared it to the series Special Branch (1969–74), in which Sewell had also appeared. Mark Lewisohn compared it to The Sweeney (1975–78), describing Sewell's role as "a deadpan spin on that series' Chief Inspector Haskins". Moreover, the original sketches were introduced by a blue-tinted sequence and musical score that parodied The Sweeney's opening titles.

Each episode showcased different guest stars, and some of them played the same characters they had played in other television series: Leslie Grantham appeared as Danny Kane from The Paradise Club, while John Nettles and Terence Alexander reprised their roles from Bergerac.

In 2012, BBC1 broadcast a one-off sketch show The One Jasper Carrott (part of a series showcasing various comedians) which included an extended sketch about Briggs and Louis having formed an incompetent private detective agency, Sherlock and Holmes.

Characters

David Briggs
Briggs (Robert Powell) usually spoofs the leader of a crime-fighting duo that takes all the risks, leads the cases and comes up with the ideas, but is always unluckier with women.

Bob Louis
Though being the cynic and the voice of reason, Bob Louis (Jasper Carrott) is as hopeless as Briggs at flirting with women.

Superintendent Cottam
Frank Cottam (George Sewell) is a parody of Sewell's earlier character in Euston Films drama Special Branch. Cottam usually gives Briggs and Louis dangerous assignments to get rid of them.

Nozzer
Nozzer (Tony Selby) is a desk sergeant at West End Central police station. His first episode was in "Rear Window", although in this episode, the character was a dog handler rather than a desk sergeant. He also appeared in "DC of Love", "Curse of the Comanches", "Sacked" and "Best Man"

Episodes

Series 1 (1993)

Series 2 (1994)

Series 3 (1995)

Special (1995)

Series 4 (1996)

Series 5 (1997)

Special (1997)

DVD releases
 Series 1 – June 2006
 Series 2 – September 2006
 Series 3 – October 2006
 Series 4 and "Thicker Than Water" – February 2007
 Series 5 and "Go West, Old Man" – April 2007
 The Complete Collection – 12 November 2007

References

External links

BBC television sitcoms
BBC television comedy
1990s British sitcoms
1990s British police comedy television series
1993 British television series debuts
1997 British television series endings
English-language television shows
1990s British crime television series